Burden of a Day was an American post-hardcore band from Sarasota, Florida, formed in January 2000. The band was signed to Rise Records and were influenced by bands such as Thrice, The Bled, All That Remains. They played their final show in Sarasota on March 6, 2010. Burden of a Day started as a worship band in church, until they were moved to reach out to people with their music.

Most of the members of Burden of a Day are still together, working on their new, untitled album. These members include Morgan, Terry and Kyle. The upcoming album will be released under a new band name and with a fresh style of music. This band is called Colours and currently have three songs released on YouTube: "The Illusionist", "The Machine", and "The Passenger".

History
The band formed in 2000 and signed to independent label Blood & Ink Records in 2005 for their debut full-length, which followed in 2006. They toured extensively before signing to Rise Records for their 2008 release, Blessed Be Our Ever After.

The group has been compared by critics to Underoath, As I Lay Dying and A Skylit Drive.

The group's 2009 release Oneonethousand reached No. 25 on the Billboard Top Christian Albums chart and No. 21 on the Heatseekers chart.

Members
Final lineup
Kyle Tamosaitis - lead vocals (2008–2010)
Josh Sommers - guitars, backing vocals (2004–2010)
Mike Sommers - guitars, backing vocals (2007–2010)
Morgan Alley - drums (2008–2010)
Terry Clark - bass guitar, backing vocals (2004–2010)

Former
Chris Scott - drums (2008)
Kendall Knepp - lead vocals (2004–2008)
Jesse Hostetler - drums (2004–2008)
Bryan Honhart - guitar (2000–2007) - Last original member.

Timeline

Discography
Pilots & Paper Planes (2006)
Blessed Be Our Ever After (2008)
Oneonethousand (2009)

References

External links
Official MySpace
Official Purevolume

Musical groups from Florida
American post-hardcore musical groups
Christian alternative metal groups
Rise Records artists
American Christian metal musical groups
Musical groups established in 2000
Musical groups disestablished in 2010
Metalcore musical groups from Florida